Paul Atkins, ASC, is an American cinematographer and director specializing in natural history films. Atkins is known for the footage of killer whales preying on seal pups in the BBC's The Trials of Life (1990), for which he won a British Academy of Film and Television Arts (BAFTA) award. Atkins also was the director of photography for the Cape Horn unit for the feature film Master and Commander, which won an Academy Award for Cinematography by Russell Boyd. Atkins has been nominated for an Emmy award numerous times, winning it for his work in Great White Shark (1995) (Cinematography), and Hawaii: Strangers in Paradise (1991) (Cinematography, Outstanding Cultural Programming). Recently he has formed a partnership with Terrence Malick, serving as a second-unit director for The Tree of Life (2011), and as director of photography for Malick's eighth feature Voyage of Time (2016).

Atkins' union affiliation is with IATSE Atkins resides in Hawaii, where he has also worked locally such as shooting commercials for Hawaiian Electric Company and U.S. Senator Daniel Inouye. He works together with his wife, Grace Atkins, in their company Moana Productions.

Filmography

External links

Paulatkins.com, see also awards and filmography.
Through a Lens, Brilliantly
ASC Welcomes Paul Atkins as a New Member
Paul Atkins (B.S. '73)
Paul Atkins Tribeca Film Institute
Paul Atkins LinkedIn
Ocean Adventures PBS

American cinematographers
Living people
Year of birth missing (living people)